Ayothaya, officially Thetsaban Mueang Ayothaya, is a town in Phra Nakhon Si Ayutthaya district of Phra Nakhon Si Ayutthaya province. It is a town (thetsaban mueang) which covers part of the tambons Phai Ling, Hantra, and Khlong Suan Phlu.

References

Populated places in Phra Nakhon Si Ayutthaya province
Cities and towns in Thailand